The 1930 College Basketball All-Southern Team consisted of basketball players from the South chosen at their respective positions.

All-Southerns

Guards
Billy Werber, Duke (AP-1)
Paul McBrayer, Kentucky (AP-1)
Bobby Dodd, Tennessee (AP-2)
Bill Laney, Alabama (AP-2)

Forwards
Harry Councilor, Duke (AP-1)
Maurice Corbitt, Tennessee (AP-1)
Sandford Sanford, Georgia (AP-2)
Earl Smith, Alabama (AP-2)

Center
Lindy Hood, Alabama (AP-1)
Joe Croson, Duke (AP-2)

Key
AP = chosen by the Associated Press.

References

All-Southern